Moving is a British sitcom that aired on ITV in 1985. It stars Penelope Keith and was written by Stanley Price. It was made for the ITV network by Thames Television.

Background
Stanley Price adapted Moving from a comedy play of the same name he had written. The play had enjoyed a successful run in London. Unusually for a sitcom, Moving was recorded without a studio audience. The six episodes were later edited into a 90-minute programme and shown on 2 September 1987.

Cast
Penelope Keith — Sarah Gladwyn
Ronald Pickup - Frank Gladwyn
Prunella Gee - Liz Ford
David Ashford - Bill Lomax
Eliza Hunt - Beryl Fearnley
Roger Lloyd-Pack - Jimmy Ryan
Natalie Slater - Eileen Lewis
Barbara Wilshere - Jane Gladwyn

Plot
Now that their children have grown up and left home, Sarah and Frank Gladwyn are alone in their large family home. However, when they decide to move Sarah insists on selling it to "the right person". However, things soon start to go wrong and their daughter Jane also returns from college. Meanwhile, Sarah's sister Liz Ford is taking Valium.

Episodes
Episode One (9 January 1985)
Episode Two (16 January 1985)
Episode Three (23 January 1985)
Episode Four (30 January 1985)
Episode Five (6 February 1985)
Episode Six (13 February 1985)

References

Sources
Mark Lewisohn, "Radio Times Guide to TV Comedy", BBC Worldwide Ltd, 2003
British TV Comedy Guide for Moving

External links 
 

1985 British television series debuts
1985 British television series endings
1980s British sitcoms
ITV sitcoms
Television series by Fremantle (company)
Television shows produced by Thames Television
English-language television shows